Marcin Łukaszewski (20 November 1972, Częstochowa, Poland) is an author,  pianist, music theorist and composer who graduated in 1996 from the Fryderyk Chopin University of Music in Warsaw. With two postgraduate diplomas on contemporary music and music theory from the Warsaw Music Academy, he is also the author of the monograph Wojciech Łukaszewski – życie i twórczość, on the life and work of his father, the composer Wojciech Łukaszewski, published by  WSP Publishing (Wydawnictwo Wyższej Szkoły Pedagogicznej) in Częstochowa in 1997.

Discography
 XXth Century Polish Piano Music (Acte Préalable AP0016, 1999)
 Franciszek Lessel - Complete Piano Works (Acte Préalable AP0022, AP0023, 1999)
 Piotr Perkowski – Piano Works (Acte Préalable AP0072, 2001–2002)

References

1972 births
21st-century Polish pianists
People from Częstochowa
Living people
Polish composers
Polish music theorists